The 1978–79 Liga Bet season saw Hapoel Bnei Nazareth, Hapoel Umm al-Fahm, Hapoel Ramat HaSharon and Beitar Be'er Sheva win their regional divisions and promoted to Liga Alef.

North Division A

North Division B

Hapoel Beit Eliezer withdrew from the league during the season.

South Division A

South Division B

References
Saturday at Bet leagues, The tables (Page 7) Hadshot HaSport, 29.4.79, archive.football.co.il 

Liga Bet seasons
Israel
4